The 1927 Auckland City mayoral election was part of the New Zealand local elections held that same year. In 1927, elections were held for the Mayor of Auckland plus other local government positions including twenty-one city councillors. The polling was conducted using the standard first-past-the-post electoral method.

Mayoralty results

Councillor results

References

Mayoral elections in Auckland
1927 elections in New Zealand
Politics of the Auckland Region
1920s in Auckland